The white-browed foliage-gleaner (Anabacerthia amaurotis) is a species of bird in the family Furnariidae. It is found in the southern Atlantic Forest. Its natural habitats are subtropical or tropical moist lowland forest and subtropical or tropical moist montane forest. It is becoming rare due to habitat loss.

References

white-browed foliage-gleaner
Birds of the Atlantic Forest
white-browed foliage-gleaner
Taxonomy articles created by Polbot
Taxa named by Coenraad Jacob Temminck